Magura Government Girls' High School is a school of Magura District which was established in 1903. The school was nationalized in 1970.

History
The school was established in 1903. After 67 years, the school was nationalized.

Educational activities
There are approximately 1200 students are reading in the school. 35 teachers are teaching the students in the institution. In 2018, the school led Magura District in terms of students scoring a GPA-5 on the Secondary School Certificate exams.

Co-curricular activities
The students of the school are taking part in debate, girl guides, scouts, cultural function etc. activities.

See also
 Magura Government High School

References

Girls' schools in Bangladesh
Magura District